Sweet Talker is the third studio album by English singer, songwriter  Jessie J. It was released on 13 October 2014, by Lava Records and Island Records. Contributing on the album; including rappers 2 Chainz, and Nicki Minaj, singer Ariana Grande, making guest appearances, and the addition to the album was the hip hop group De La Soul and the violinist Lindsey Stirling. Jessie co-wrote the album and worked with several producers such as The-Dream, Diplo, Tricky Stewart, Max Martin, Ammo and amongst the hosts of collaborators from both the new and the old.

The album was preceded by the lead single, "Bang Bang" (with Ariana Grande and Nicki Minaj), which met with critical acclaim from music critics. It also became a worldwide hit, topping the charts in the United Kingdom, reaching the top 10 in Australia, Canada, Denmark, New Zealand, and reaching the top 3 in the United States, becoming Jessie's most successful single. The third single, "Masterpiece" was also successful by reaching the top-ten; including Germany, Switzerland and Austria as well as the top-twenty in Australia and New Zealand. Moreover, the song scored Jessie J her fifth US Billboard Hot 100 hit, following the aforementioned "Bang Bang".

Upon its release, the album received generally mixed reviews from music critics, some of whom commended Jessie's vocal performance, confidence and the production, while others criticised the lack of creativity. In the United States, Sweet Talker debuted at number ten on the US Billboard 200, selling 25,000 copies in its first week. Sweet Talker became Jessie J's first top ten album and her highest charting album in the US to date. In the United Kingdom (Jessie J's home country), "Sweet Talker" debuted at number five selling 16,733 copies, and is certified Silver for sales over 60,000.

Background
After releasing her second studio album, Alive, in the United Kingdom on 22 September 2013, Jessie J announced that the American version of the album would be pushed back because her American label "didn't feel the album would work on their territory". She was then rumored to be recording new material for an American re-release of the album with Pharrell Williams. In an interview, the singer discussed the possibility of moving to the United States in an effort to break back into the country's market. Jessie later said the American version of the album was expected to be released in 2014. However, the re-release idea was eventually scrapped. The project became her third studio album, featuring the material recorded with Williams, as well as contributions from producers such as Max Martin and Ammo.

Promotion
"Ain't Been Done", "Keep Us Together", "Sweet Talker" and "You Don't Really Know Me" were all performed live at Rock in Rio Lisbon on 1 June 2014. "Bang Bang" was performed live on the Elvis Duran and the Morning Show on 31 July 2014. Moreover, the song was performed as part of the opening medley held by Jessie, Ariana Grande and Nicki Minaj during the MTV VMAs 2014. In August, Jessie teased a snippet of 2 Chainz's verse on "Burnin' Up" in an interview with Idolator. On 22 September 2014, Jessie performed at iTunes Festival in London. She sang some songs from the new album, like "Sweet Talker", "Your Loss I'm Found", "Keep Us Together", "You Don't Really Know Me", "Ain't Been Done", "Burnin' Up", and "Bang Bang". On 30 September 2014, Jessie announced via Twitter that "Personal" was made available on iTunes for anyone who pre-ordered the entire album as a promotional single. "Ain't Been Done" and "Masterpiece" were made available as promotional singles in the same manner on 7 October 2014.

Sweet Talker Tour
On 4 November 2014, Jessie J announced a six-date tour in the UK. An extra London date was added due to popular demand after tickets sold out for the first date. During 2015 Jessie J travelled around the world promoting her album on the Sweet Talker Tour.

Singles
The album's first single, "Bang Bang" featuring Ariana Grande and Nicki Minaj, was first sent to hot adult contemporary radio on 28 July 2014 through Republic Records, the label that houses all three artists, being released as a digital download the next day through Lava and Republic, and serves as a joint single. Commercially, the song became a worldwide hit, debuting at number 6 on the US Billboard Hot 100, and eventually peaking at number 3, making it Jessie's highest peaking song on the chart. It also reached the top ten in Canada, Australia and New Zealand.

On 19 September Jessie announced on Instagram that the official second single is "Burnin' Up" featuring 2 Chainz. The single was released on 23 September on iTunes. On 22 September the song leaked 24 hours earlier than expected. Despite planned release in the United Kingdom, Jessie J's management failed to release it to mainstream radio and as a digital single.
 
"Masterpiece" was released as the third single from the album. Originally released digitally 7 October 2014 as a promotional single, its music video premiered 10 December 2014 to promote it as the next official single. The single was planned to be added to UK contemporary hit radio on 23 March 2015 but this failed to comprehend for the third time. Despite this, efforts from fans pushed the album song to enter the UK Singles chart at 159.

Promotional singles
The title track, "Sweet Talker", was released as a promotional single in the UK and Ireland on 1 December 2014. On 10 July 2015, "Ain’t Been Done" was released as the second promotional single only in Australia.

Critical reception

The album received mixed reviews from music critics, some of whom complimented Jessie J's confidence and vocals and the overall production, whilst others criticised the songs for being "generic". Joanne Dorken from MTV gave it 4 out 5 stars saying that Jessie was "back with a bang!" and said J's "fans were in for a treat", praising tracks like "Ain't Been Done", "Fire", "Masterpiece" and "Sweet Talker", adding that "Overall, Jessie's third offering sees her going back to basics, while also teaming up with a whole hoard of songwriters (52 in total) to craft her more grown-up, more honest sound." The Guardian gave the album a positive review, stating that "[J] constructed Sweet Talker to fit a gap somewhere between Beyoncé and Pink", adding that "it's notable that the best moments come when she uncouples herself from it and just sings for the joy of it, as on the brilliant, fizzy pop banger 'Bang Bang', a deserved No 1 this summer".

Slant Magazine was more critical towards the album, giving it a mixed review, praising the first four tracks on the album but stating that "If all Jessie's label wanted was a few bangers, they could have saved themselves some time and money by tacking them onto a repackaged version of Alive and calling it a day". Katherine St. Aspah of Time was harsher still, claiming that the album "solved the problem of doing everything right [to only moderate success]", and comes across as "slapdash and retooled to an inch of its life". Aspah did reiterate that "the one distinguishing factor of the Jessie J Brand, as demonstrated on Sweet Talker, is that she can sing", but then went on to clarify that it seemed "a curious statement to make in 2014, as the year's biggest divas, our Beyoncés and Arianas, aren't short on chops". Slant Magazine named it the eighth worst album of 2014.

Commercial performance

In the United States, Sweet Talker debuted at number ten on the US Billboard 200, selling 25,000 copies in its first week. Despite selling 9,000 copies less than her previous US album, Who You Are, Sweet Talker became Jessie J's first top ten album and her highest charting album in the US to date.
In the United Kingdom, "Sweet Talker" debuted at number five selling 16,733 copies, and is certified Silver for sales over 60,000. The album spent a total of 4 weeks inside the Top 40 of the UK Albums Chart.

Track listing

Note
 Vocal production on every track was handled by Kuk Harrell with the exception of "Strip", which contains vocal production by Claude Kelly and "Personal", which contains vocal production by Jenna Andrews in addition to Harrell.

Sample credit
 "Seal Me with a Kiss" contains an interpolation of "(Not Just) Knee Deep", written by George Clinton and Philippé Wynne.

Personnel
Credits for Sweet Talker adapted from Barnes & Noble.

Performance credits

Jessie J – primary artist, background vocals
Louis Biancaniello – keyboards
Steve Booker – bass, percussion, keyboards
Susan Dench – viola
David Gamson – drums, keyboards
Ivan McCready – cello
Leo Payne – violin
Audrey Riley – conductor
Cathy Thompson – violin
Fenella Barton – violin
Joy Hawley – cello
Peter Lale – viola
Clare Thompson – violin
Andrew Parker – viola
Max Martin – keyboards
Joi Gilliam – background vocals
Ian Humphries – violin
Derrick McKenzie – drums
Warren Zielinski – violin
Sophie Harris – cello
Nick Barr – violin
Roland Roberts – violin
Adrian Bradbury – cello
Ilya – background vocals
Joan Atherton – violin
Richard George – violin
Bridget Carey – viola
Laura Melhuish – violin
Courtney Harrell – background vocals
Lifted – keyboards
Rickard Goransson – bass, percussion, keyboards, background vocals
Boguslav Kostecki – violin
Katherine Gowers – violin
Taura Stinson – background vocals
Greg Warren Wilson – violin
William "Nasty Kutt" Wiik Larsen – background vocals
2 Chainz – vocals
Peter Carlsson – percussion, drums
Ricky Reed – background vocals
Chris Trombling – violin
Chonita Gillespie – background vocals
Kathy Gowers – violin
Jon Hill – violin

Technical credits

Louis Biancaniello – programming, producer
Steve Booker – programming, producer, string arrangements
David Gamson – programming, producer, engineer
Pat Thrall – engineer
Scott Roewe – pro-Tools
Tom Coyne – mastering
Kuk Harrell – producer, vocal engineer, vocal producer
Scott Harris – programming
Max Martin – programming, producer
Steve Mac – producer, string arrangements, piano arrangement
Josh Alexander – programming, producer, instrumentation
Chris Laws – engineer
Diplo – producer
Pop! – instrumentation
Jonas Jeberg – producer
Lifted – programming, producer
Todd Russell – art direction
Andrew Wuepper – engineer
Smit – programming
Rickard Goransson – programming, producer
Sam Holland – engineer
C. "Tricky" Stewart – programming, producer
Dann Pursey – engineer
Brian "B-Luv" Thomas – engineer
Rob Stevenson – executive producer
Terius "The-Dream" Nash – producer
Jenna Andrews – vocal producer
Pop Wansel – producer
William "Nasty Kutt" Wiik Larsen – instrumentation
Antonio Rizzello – programming
Oak Felder – instrumentation, producer
Peter Carlsson – vocal engineer, vocal editing
Daniel Zaidenstadt – engineer
Axident – producer, engineer
Will Idap – producer
Ricky Reed – producer, engineer
Picard Brothers – programming, producer
Ryan Vojtesak – producer
Chris Trombling – orchestra leader
Alessia Degasperis Brigante – composer
Jack Brown – vocal engineer
Arek Kopera – drum engineering
Godz of Analog – producer

Charts

Weekly charts

Year-end charts

Certifications

Release history

References

2014 albums
Albums produced by Diplo
Albums produced by Ilya Salmanzadeh
Albums produced by Max Martin
Albums produced by The-Dream
Albums produced by Tricky Stewart
Jessie J albums
Lava Records albums
Republic Records albums
Island Records albums
Albums produced by Oak Felder